Dům pro dva is a 1988 Czechoslovak drama film directed by Miloš Zábranský. This film stars two of the most recognized Czech actors, Ondřej Vetchý who plays Dan, and Jiří Schmitzer as Bóza.

Plot
The story is about two brothers, both competing for the affection of their ailing mother, the friendship of their workmates and the love of a beautiful woman.

Boza, the older brother dedicates himself to hard work at the printing plant where they are both employed. His younger brother Dan slacks off and loots the factory for things to sell on the black market. He drinks with his friends at the local bar and has sex with many loose women.

When Boza falls in love with a beautiful coworker, Dan makes love to her just to spite his older brother (in a very shocking sex scene). Dan's torment and cruelty to his older brother continues until it has a shocking result.

Set in the dark world of Communist era Czechoslovakia, this disturbing film targets the very cruel nature of human beings to take advantage of those less fortunate. It also targets the corruption of the world in which the characters live.

External links
 

1988 films
Czechoslovak drama films
1980s Czech-language films
Czech drama films
1980s Czech films